The 2001 Spengler Cup was held in Davos, Switzerland from December 26 to December 31, 2001.  All matches were played at HC Davos's home arena, Eisstadion Davos. The final was won 4-3 by HC Davos over Team Canada.

Teams participating
 Team Canada
 HC Davos
 HC TPS
 Adler Mannheim
 HC Sparta Praha

Tournament

Round-Robin results

All times local (CET/UTC +1)

Finals

External links
Spenglercup.ch

2001–02
2001–02 in Swiss ice hockey
2001–02 in Czech ice hockey
2001–02 in Canadian ice hockey
2001–02 in Finnish ice hockey
2001–02 in German ice hockey
December 2001 sports events in Europe